Théodore Nkwayed (born 6 March 1967) is a Cameroonian weightlifter. He competed in the men's heavyweight I event at the 1988 Summer Olympics.

References

1967 births
Living people
Cameroonian male weightlifters
Olympic weightlifters of Cameroon
Weightlifters at the 1988 Summer Olympics
Place of birth missing (living people)
20th-century Cameroonian people